Arapoviće is a village in the municipality of Tutin, Serbia. According to the 2002 census, the village has a population of 61 people.

Demographics 

In the village of Arapović, 49 adult residents live there and the average age is 40.0 years ( 36.8 for men and 43.0 for women) . The village has 15 households, and the average number of members per household is 4.07.

This village is largely inhabited by Bosniaks (according to the 2002 census ) .

References

Populated places in Raška District